Serano is a surname. Notable people with the surname include:

 Julia Serano (b. 1967), transgender American writer, performer, activist, and biologist
 Greg Serano (b. 1972), American actor
 Tommy Serano, German DJ, producer/remixer
 Carmen Serano (b. 1973), a Hispanic American actress

See also
Serrano (name)